General Leon William Johnson (13 September 1904 – 10 November 1997) was a United States Air Force general who was awarded the  Medal of Honor for leading the attack on the Ploesti oil fields during World War II.

A graduate of the United States Military Academy at West Point, New York, Johnson was commissioned a second lieutenant in the infantry in 1926. He joined the United States Army Air Corps in 1929, and qualified as a pilot. He earned a Master of Science degree in meteorology from California Institute of Technology in  1936.

During World War II, Johnson was one of the first four flying officers of the Eighth Air Force, and served on it staff during its formative period at Savannah, Georgia. In 1943, he assumed command of the 44th Bombardment Group, which flew the Consolidated B-24 Liberator. Johnson led the attack on the German naval installations at Kiel in May 1943 and the attack on the Ploesti oil fields in August 1943, for which the 44th Bombardment Group received Distinguished Unit Citations. He commanded the 14th Combat Bombardment Wing from September 1943 until May 1945.

After the war, Johnson commanded the Strategic Air Command's Fifteenth Air Force. He returned to England in 1948 to lead the 3rd Air Division, and then the Third Air Force, as it was redesignated in 1951. Despite his lowly rank of major general, he was able to hold his own in dealings with more senior British officers and officials, and performed his duties with diplomacy and sensitivity. He returned to the United States in 1952 as head of the Continental Air Command. He was air deputy to the Supreme Allied Commander Europe, at SHAPE Headquarters from 1958 until he retired in 1961, but on later that year he was recalled to active duty to become director of the National Security Council's Net Evaluation Subcommittee Staff at the Pentagon. He finally retired in 1965.

Early life

Johnson was born in Columbia, Missouri, on 13 September 1904. He had an older brother, a younger brother, and a sister. In 1919, the family moved to Moline, Kansas, where he went to high school. He played on the high school football team as a halfback, and was vice president of his senior class. After graduation, he worked in the family's bank.

Johnson entered the United States Military Academy at West Point, New York, on 1 July 1922, and graduated 60th out of 152 graduates in the class of 1926 on 12 June 1926. In his final year, he was the First Sergeant of Company C. He was commissioned a second lieutenant in the infantry on 12 June 1926, and was posted to the 17th Infantry at Fort Crook, Nebraska, on 12 September 1926. He volunteered for service in United States Army Air Corps, and on 1 March 1929 he reported to the Air Corps Primary Flying School at Brooks Field, Texas, as a student officer. He married Lucille Taylor before completion of flight training. They had two daughters, Sue and Sarah. He was next sent to Kelly Field, Texas, for further training with the Observation Section from 15 October 1929 to 28 February 1930. 
  
On 1 March 1930, Johnson joined the 5th Observation Squadron at Mitchell Field, New York, as its adjutant and engineering officer, and was promoted to first lieutenant on 1 December 1931. On 15 June 1932 he joined the 2d Observation Squadron at Nichols Field in the Philippines. He returned to the United States in July 1935, and on 30 July 1935 he entered the California Institute of Technology, from which he received a Master of Science degree in meteorology on 1 July 1936. He was promoted to captain on 13 June 1936. He was then posted to Barksdale Field, Louisiana, as operations officer until 1 July 1937, when he became commander of the 3rd Weather Squadron, and was a student at the Air Corps Tactical School from 5 June to 25 August 1939.

World War II
Johnson was operations officer of the 3d Bombardment Group at Barksdale Field from 15 July 1940 to 12 September 1940, and then its weather officer until 27 December 1940.  The group moved to Savannah Army Air Base on 6 October 1940, and he was promoted to major on 16 November 1940. He became commander of the group's 90th Bombardment Squadron on 16 December 1940, and then its 10th Reconnaissance Squadron on 9 May 1941. He became operations officer (A-3) of the III Air Support Command when it was activated in September 1941.

Johnson was one of the first four flying officers of the Eighth Air Force and served as assistant chief of staff for operations (A-3) during its formative period at Savannah, Georgia. With the United States now a belligerent in World War II, promotion accelerated, and he was promoted to lieutenant colonel on 5 January 1942, and then colonel on 1 March 1942. He accompanied the Eighth Air Force to England in June 1942.

On 8 January 1943, Johnson assumed command of the 44th Bombardment Group, flying the Consolidated B-24 Liberator. It flew bombing missions against a variety of targets. On 14 May 1943, Johnson led 17 B-24s from the 44th Bombardment Group which, along with 109 Boeing B-17 Flying Fortresses, attacked the German naval installations at  Kiel, the most distant target attacked by the Eighth Air Force up to that time. The B-24, carrying incendiaries, came under particularly heavy attack from German fighters, as they were unable to stay close enough the B-17s to be protected by their gunfire, and had to open up their own formation to attack; five of the eight aircraft shot down were B-24s. For this raid the 44th Bombardment Group received a Distinguished Unit Citation.

The 44th Bombardment Group took part in an even more costly raid, the attack on the Romanian Ploesti oil fields, on 1 August 1943. When Johnson arrived at the target leading his group, he found that the 93d Bombardment Group had already attacked their target by mistake, and as a consequence, the defenders were alert. Although he would have been justified in turning back, Johnson led his group in through thick smoke, flak and explosions that concealed the tall smokestacks and barrage balloon cables. On the way home, they had to fight off Bf 109 fighters.

Johnson's own plane was charred black by the flames, and hit by flak several times but managed to return safely. In all, 54 of the 177 aircraft involved in the raid were lost, along with 532 of the 1,725 crewmen. Although 42 percent of the refining capacity was destroyed, the Germans were able to soon restore production. The 44th Bombardment Group received a second Distinguished Unit Citation. For his part in that raid, Johnson was awarded the Medal of Honor.

In addition, for his leadership of the 44th Bombardment Group, Johnson was awarded the Legion of Merit, the Silver Star, two Distinguished Flying Crosses and four Air Medals.  commanded the 14th Combat Bombardment Wing from 3 September 1943 until 10 May 1945. He was promoted to brigadier general on 6 November 1943.

Post World War II
After V-E Day, he was Chief of Personnel Services at Headquarters, Army Air Forces, in Washington, DC, from 28 June 1945 to 15 May 1946. He then became deputy to the Assistant Chief of Air Staff for Personnel from 16 May 1946 to 28 April 1947. He was commander of the Strategic Air Command's Fifteenth Air Force at Colorado Springs, Colorado, from 1 May 1947 to 2 August 1948, with the rank of major general from 27 October 1947. The Air Force returned to England for the first time since World War II when Johnson organized the 3rd Air Division there on 20 August 1948. The division provided facilities for maintenance and support of Strategic Air Command aircraft on rotational training missions to Europe and for transport aircraft used in the Berlin Airlift. It was redesignated the Third Air Force on 1 May 1951. In addition to his other duties, chief of the Military Assistance Advisory Group for the United Kingdom.

As commander of the 3rd Air Division and later the Third Air Force, he was subordinate to United States Air Forces in Europe, but also had to deal with USAF headquarters and the Strategic Air Command. He was also designated the point of contact for dealing with the British government. Despite his lowly rank of major general, he was able to hold his own in dealings with more senior British officers, and with senior British officials, including the Prime Minister of the United Kingdom, Clement Attlee. His command was understaffed, lacked a clear mission, and there was no agreement with the British government regarding base rights or financial responsibilities. Nor was it easy dealing with his Strategic Air Command colleagues like Archie J. Old Jr., who were not renowned for diplomatic skill. Johnson's deft touch was perhaps exemplified by his order that the Royal Air Force Ensign be flown over US bases in the UK alongside the flag of the United States.

On 21 February 1952, he was named commander of the Continental Air Command at Mitchel Air Force Base, New York. From July 1953, he was concurrently U.S. Air Force Representative to the United Nations Military Staff Committee. He was U.S. Representative to the NATO Military Committee, Military Representatives Committee, and NATO Standing Group, stationed in Washington, D.C., from April 1956 until May 1958, when he became air deputy to the Supreme Allied Commander Europe, at SHAPE Headquarters in Paris, France. He retired on 31 July 1961, but on 15 September 1961 he was recalled to active duty to become director of the National Security Council's Net Evaluation Subcommittee Staff at the Pentagon. He retired a second time on 30 April 1965.

Death and legacy
Johnson settled in McLean, Virginia and worked as a consultant. His hobbies included growing flowers, and he was president of the National Capitol Dahlia Society. He was interviewed for The World at War.

He died of a respiratory infection on 10 November 1997 at Belvoir Woods health care facility in Fairfax, Virginia, and was buried in Arlington National Cemetery next to his wife, Lucille Taylor Johnson, who had died in 1983. He was survived his two daughters, Sarah Abbott and Sue Vandenberg, who had married Hoyt S. Vandenberg Jr., the son of General Hoyt S. Vandenberg. Of Johnson's Medal of Honor, war correspondent Andy Rooney wrote in 1995 that "no infantryman deserved it more than this good and brave Air Force general."

In 2008, Johnson's grandson, Leon Abbott, donated the medal to the U.S. Army Heritage and Education Center in Carlisle, Pennsylvania, which holds a large collection of material relating to the 44th Bombardment Group. "There's a book by Tom Wolfe, The Right Stuff", Abbott recalled. "I do feel my grandfather had the right stuff."

Awards and decorations

Medal of Honor citation
Rank and organization: Colonel, U.S. Army Air Corps, 44th Bomber Group, 9th Air Force.
Place and date: Ploesti Raid, Rumania, 1 August 1943.
Entered service at: Moline, Kans. Born: 13 September 1904, Columbia, Mo.
G.O. No.: 54, 7 September 1943.

Dates of rank

Notes

References 

 

 
 
 

1904 births
1997 deaths
People from Columbia, Missouri
United States Air Force generals
United States Military Academy alumni
United States Army Air Forces Medal of Honor recipients
Recipients of the Air Medal
Recipients of the Distinguished Flying Cross (United States)
Recipients of the Distinguished Flying Cross (United Kingdom)
Recipients of the Air Force Distinguished Service Medal
Recipients of the Legion of Merit
Recipients of the Silver Star
Recipients of the Croix de guerre (Belgium)
Recipients of the Croix de Guerre (France)
California Institute of Technology alumni
Burials at Arlington National Cemetery
United States Army Air Forces pilots of World War II
United States Army Air Forces generals
Chevaliers of the Légion d'honneur
World War II recipients of the Medal of Honor
United States Army Air Forces generals of World War II